Riders of the Purple Sage is a 1931 American pre-Code Western film based upon the novel by Zane Grey, directed by Hamilton MacFadden, photographed by George Schneiderman, and starring George O'Brien and Marguerite Churchill. The picture was released by the Fox Film Corporation with a running time of 58 minutes and remains the third of five screen versions. It was the first sound version. The movie was followed later the same year by a similar adaptation of the novel's sequel, The Rainbow Trail, also starring O'Brien.

Plot

Cast
 George O'Brien as Jim Lassiter
 Marguerite Churchill as Jane Withersteen
 Noah Beery as Judge Dyer
 Yvonne Pelletier as 	Bess
 James Todd as Vern Venters
 Stanley Fields as Oldring
 Lester Dorr as Judkins
 Shirley Nail as	Fay Larkin
 Frank McGlynn Jr. as	Adam Tull, Gang leader
 Cliff Lyons as Jed

References

External links
  Riders of the Purple Sage in the Internet Movie Database
 Riders of the Purple Sage at Turner Classic Movies
 Riders of the Purple Sage synopsis at Moviephone

1931 films
1931 Western (genre) films
Films based on works by Zane Grey
American Western (genre) films
Films based on American novels
Films directed by Hamilton MacFadden
American black-and-white films
Fox Film films
1930s American films
1930s English-language films